The 1994 Canoe Slalom World Cup was a series of five races in 4 canoeing and kayaking categories organized by the International Canoe Federation (ICF). It was the 7th edition. The series consisted of 4 regular world cup races and the world cup final.

Calendar

Final standings 

The winner of each world cup race was awarded 25 points. The points scale reached down to 1 point for 15th place. Only the best two results of each athlete from the first 4 world cups plus the result from the world cup final counted for the final world cup standings. If two or more athletes or boats were equal on points, the ranking was determined by their positions in the world cup final.

Results

World Cup Race 1 

The first world cup race of the season took place at the Holme Pierrepont National Watersports Centre in Nottingham from 24 to 26 June.

World Cup Race 2 

The second world cup race of the season took place at the Augsburg Eiskanal from 2 to 3 July.

World Cup Race 3 

The third world cup race of the season took place in Bourg St.-Maurice, France from 8 to 10 July.

World Cup Race 4 

The fourth world cup race of the season took place at the Segre Olympic Park in La Seu d'Urgell from 16 to 17 July.

World Cup Final 

The final world cup race of the season took place in Asahi, Aichi, Japan from 16 to 18 September.

References

External links 
 International Canoe Federation

Canoe Slalom World Cup
1994 in canoeing